Fontanetti’s were a collegiate summer baseball team located in San Jose, California, founded in 1965, as a successor to previous teams managed by Jerry Fontanetti in the 1950s. Founder Jerry Fontanetti was the owner of Fontanetti’s Batting Cages, which operated in San Jose from 1953 until 2016. 

The team was first called Fontanetti’s of San Jose, named for owner Jerry Fontanetti’s San Jose batting cages.

Fontanetti’s was a powerhouse semi-pro baseball team in Northern California with prominent rivals included other perennial winners such as the Humboldt Crabs. 

In the 1970s, at the height of the rival Humboldt Crabs, Fontanetti’s were California State Semi-Pro runners up in 1976 and 1977 losing to the Crabs before beating the Crabs and winning the 1978 California State Championship. With the win, Fontanetti’s broke the Crabs’ streak of 15 straight California State Semi-Pro Championships.

After more than 50 seasons, the Fontanetti’s A’s played their final season in 2014, the year before Fontanetti’s Batting Cages closed in 2016.

Notable alumni
Ron Mingo, World's Fastest TypistRich Bordi (1978)

References

External links
 Facebook Page
 Archived Website
 Team photos from Gold Old Sandlot Days
 News Clip on Fontanetti’s

Amateur baseball teams in California
Sports teams in San Jose, California
1965 establishments in California
Baseball teams established in 1965